This is a list of the main career statistics of retired Russian professional tennis player Dinara Safina. Throughout her career, Safina won twelve WTA Tour singles titles including three Tier I singles titles at the 2008 German Open, Rogers Cup and Pan Pacific Open, respectively; one Premier Mandatory singles title at the 2009 Madrid Open and one Premier 5 singles title at the 2009 Italian Open. She was also the runner-up at the 2008 French Open and the 2009 Australian Open and French Open as well as a silver medalist in singles at the 2008 Beijing Olympics.

Safina was also an accomplished doubles player, winning nine WTA doubles titles including one Grand Slam doubles title with Nathalie Dechy at the 2007 US Open, one Tier I-doubles title with Elena Vesnina at the 2008 Indian Wells Masters and three consecutive doubles titles at the Brisbane International from 2006 to 2008. Safina achieved her career-high doubles ranking of world No. 8 on May 12, 2008, and subsequently attained the No. 1 ranking in singles on April 20, 2009.

Career achievements
Safina made her main draw WTA debut at the 2002 Estoril Open, where she defeated third seed Martina Suchá en route to the semi-finals. In July of the same year, she won her first WTA singles title, as a qualifier, at the Warsaw Open after her opponent, Henrieta Nagyová retired whilst down a set and 4–0. As a result, Safina entered the top 100 of the WTA singles rankings for the first time in her career and became the youngest Russian tennis player to win a singles title on the WTA Tour. In October 2005, Safina scored her first win over a reigning world No. 1 by defeating Maria Sharapova in three sets en route to her first Tier I semifinal at the Kremlin Cup. She eventually finished the year ranked inside the top twenty for the first time at world No. 20. The following year, Safina reached the first two Grand Slam quarterfinals of her career in singles at the French Open and US Open respectively, defeating Sharapova in the fourth round of the former after overcoming a 5–1 third set deficit. She also reached her first Grand Slam doubles final at the latter event, where she and Katarina Srebotnik lost in straight sets to Nathalie Dechy and Vera Zvonareva. After a quarterfinal showing at the Luxembourg Open, Safina cracked the top ten of the WTA rankings for the first time in her career on October 2, 2006. Highlights of Safina's 2007 season were singles and doubles titles at the Brisbane International, a finals appearance at the Tier I Family Circle Cup and winning her maiden grand slam doubles title at the US Open with Dechy, after a straight sets win over Chan Yung-jan and Chuang Chia-jung in the final.

Safina enjoyed a breakthrough season in 2008. She compiled a disappointing singles win–loss record of 11–10 to start the season but won her third consecutive doubles title at the Brisbane International with Ágnes Szávay and her first and only Tier I doubles title at the Pacific Life Open with compatriot, Elena Vesnina, during the same period. Safina began her singles recovery by claiming her first Tier I singles title at the Qatar Telecom German Open, defeating World No. 1 Justine Henin, fifth seed Serena Williams, future World No. 1 Victoria Azarenka and seventh seed Elena Dementieva in the final. She later commented that the tournament had been "the key to her tennis life" as she had "felt completely lost before that tournament". At the French Open, Safina defeated World No. 1 Maria Sharapova and seventh seed Elena Dementieva in consecutive rounds after rallying from a set, 5–2 and a match point down in both matches; before overcoming fourth seed Svetlana Kuznetsova in straight sets to reach the first Grand Slam singles final of her career, where she lost in straight sets to the second seed, Ana Ivanovic. After a less impressive grass court season, during which she reached her second (and last) career singles final on grass at the Ordina Open, Safina embarked on a fifteen match winning streak, winning singles titles in Los Angeles and Montréal respectively before securing herself the silver medal in women's singles at the 2008 Beijing Olympics, after a three set loss to Dementieva in the final. As a result of her strong performances in the lead-up to the US Open, Safina finished on top of the 2008 US Open Series leader board. At the final Grand Slam event of the year, Safina advanced to her first US Open semifinal and second major singles semifinal overall after a straight sets victory over 16th seed, Flavia Pennetta. Following the event, Safina entered the top five of the WTA singles rankings for the first time, rising to world No. 5. A week later, she captured her third Tier I singles title and fourth singles title of the season overall at the Pan Pacific Open, dropping just four games in the final against Kuznetsova. As a result, she entered the top three of the WTA singles rankings for the first time in her career, rising to world No. 3. In November, Safina made her debut at the year-ending WTA Championships but lost in the round robin stage. Nevertheless, she ended the year ranked World No. 3, marking her first finish in the year-end top five and top ten.

Safina began her 2009 season by representing Russia at the Hopman Cup alongside her brother, Marat Safin. The pair finished on top of their group by winning all three of their round robin ties and thus progressed to the final, where they lost to their seventh seeded Slovakian opponents, Dominika Cibulková and Dominik Hrbatý. The following week, Safina lost to Dementieva in her first singles final of the year at the Sydney International before defeating Alizé Cornet by winning five consecutive games and saving two match points in the third set of their fourth round encounter, en route to her first Australian Open final and second grand slam singles final overall. In April, Safina became the world No. 1 for the first time in her career after replacing Serena Williams at the top of the WTA Singles Rankings. In doing so, she became the fourth woman (after Kim Clijsters, Amélie Mauresmo and Jelena Janković) to reach the summit of the sport without first winning a Grand Slam singles title. Additionally, she and her brother also became the first siblings to have both reached No. 1 in the WTA and ATP singles rankings respectively. Safina then enjoyed a dominant clay court season, during which she reached the singles finals of all four of her clay court events. She began her reign as world No. 1 with a runner-up finish in Stuttgart before claiming her first (and only) Premier 5 and Premier Mandatory singles titles at the Internazionali d'Italia and Madrid Open with wins over Svetlana Kuznetsova and Caroline Wozniacki in the finals. Safina extended her winning streak to sixteen matches by reaching her third Grand Slam singles final and second consecutive French Open final but Kuznetsova defeated her in straight sets in the pair's third meeting in a final that year. Despite the loss, Safina went on to enjoy the best grass court season of her career to date. After reaching her third semifinal at the Ordina Open, Safina defeated former champion and 17nth seed, Amélie Mauresmo and future finalist, Sabine Lisicki en route to her first Wimbledon semifinal where she fell in straight sets to the third seed, two-time defending champion and eventual runner-up, Venus Williams. She recovered by winning the 12th and final singles title of her career at the Slovenia Open before reaching a career-best eighth singles final that season, at the Western & Southern Open, where she lost to former world No. 1, Jelena Janković.

Significant finals

Grand Slam tournament finals

Singles: 3 (3 runner-ups)

Doubles: 2 (1 title, 1 runner-up)

Olympic finals

Singles: 1 (silver medal)

Tier I / Premier Mandatory & Premier 5 finals

Singles: 8 (5 titles, 3 runner-ups)

Doubles: 1 (1 title)

WTA career finals

Singles: 23 (12 titles, 11 runner-ups)

Doubles: 16 (9 titles, 7 runner-ups)

ITF finals

Singles (3–1)

Doubles (3–1)

Performance timelines

''Only main-draw results in WTA Tour, Grand Slam tournaments and Olympic Games are included in win–loss records.

Singles

Doubles

WTA Tour career earnings

*As of October 31, 2011

Record against top 10 players
Safina's record against players who have been ranked in the top 10.

Top 10 wins

Longest winning streak

16-match win streak (2009)

References

Safina, Dinara